EPSG Geodetic Parameter Dataset (also EPSG registry) is a public registry of geodetic datums, spatial reference systems, Earth ellipsoids, coordinate transformations and related units of measurement, originated by a member of the European Petroleum Survey Group (EPSG) in 1985. Each entity is assigned an EPSG code between 1024–32767,  along with a standard machine-readable well-known text (WKT) representation. The dataset is maintained by the IOGP Geomatics Committee.

Most geographic information systems (GIS) and GIS libraries use EPSG codes as Spatial Reference System Identifiers (SRIDs) and EPSG definition data for identifying coordinate reference systems, projections, and performing transformations between these systems, while some also support SRIDs issued by other organizations (such as Esri).

Common EPSG codes 
 EPSG:4326 - WGS 84, latitude/longitude coordinate system based on the Earth's center of mass, used by the Global Positioning System among others.
 EPSG:3857 - Web Mercator projection used for display by many web-based mapping tools, including Google Maps and OpenStreetMap.
EPSG:7789 - International Terrestrial Reference Frame 2014 (ITRF2014), an Earth-fixed system that is independent of continental drift.

History 
The dataset was created in 1985 by Jean-Patrick Girbig of Elf, to "standardize, improve and share spatial data between members of the European Petroleum Survey Group".  It was made public in 1993.

In 2005, the EPSG organisation was merged into International Association of Oil & Gas Producers (IOGP), and became the Geomatics Committee. However, the name of the EPSG registry was kept to avoid confusion. Since then, the acronym "EPSG" became increasingly synonymous with the dataset or registry itself.

See also 
 List of map projections

References

External links 

 

Spatial databases
Spatial analysis
Geodesy
Catalogues
Geomatics